DeRuyter Reservoir (also known as Tioughnioga Lake) is a man-made lake located north of  Puckerville, New York. Fish species present in the lake include smallmouth bass, pickerel, yellow perch, rock bass, black bullhead, common sunfish, and walleye. There is access by fee on the south shore at the general store. The reservoir was constructed from 1861 to 1863 to supply water for the Erie Canal but by the following year had proved to hold insufficient water. The dam has been worked on at least twice.

History 
In 1856, an estimate for a reservoir on Limestone Creek put the cost at $118,367.55. Construction of the reservoir was authorized by the Canal Board in January 1861, and it was opened in 1863. Charles A. Beach was in charge of initial construction. The upper Tioughnioga Creek was diverted into the reservoir. The initial purpose was to provide additional water to the Erie Canal during the dry season. In 1862, the reservoir was "brought into use, though not completed". It was completed the following year, at a total cost of $126,026.82. 

Though DeRuyter Reservoir was supposed to ensure the canal remained navigable between "Lock No. 39 and a point nine miles west of Higginsville, New York", the reservoir had proved insufficient by 1864, and it was suggested that a feeder canal be constructed at Fish Creek. By 1867, it was considered that the reservoir was 'entirely inadequate' to supply the canal. 

In the summer of 1950, the reservoir was drained to facilitate repairs costing around $100,000. That year, The Post-Standard reported that the dam was "saturated by leaks". In 2019 the Rome Sentinel reported that the dam was going to be renovated. The project was undertaken by Wesson group and completed by the end of 2020.

Gallery

References

External links
 The State of DeRuyter Reservoir, Madison County, NY and a Plan for the Management of DeRuyter Reservoir

Lakes of New York (state)
Lakes of Onondaga County, New York
Lakes of Madison County, New York